After is the third studio solo album by former Emperor frontman Ihsahn. This album is the final album in a planned trilogy of albums by Ihsahn.

Background
Ihsahn stated that After, as the final album in the trilogy, departed from the preceding albums in order to bring the concept to a close:

He further explained that the album was more abstract and possessed links to imagery expressed during his tenure with Emperor:

Through the YouTube channel of Mnemosyne Productions, there were three videos released that dealt with the recording of the album. The first video, released on 9 September 2009, focused on Ihsahn recording guitars. The second video, released on 25 November 2009, focused on the recording of the saxophone, drumming, vocals, and videotape. The third and final video was released on 11 January 2010, this time focusing more on the mixing stage of the album.

After is the first album written by Ihsahn in which he utilizes eight-string guitars.  The use of a saxophone is also featured, which Ihsahn viewed as standing in lieu of his previous albums' guest vocalists (Garm and Mikael Akerfeldt):

Track listing
All songs written by Ihsahn.
 "The Barren Lands" – 5:12
 "A Grave Inversed" – 4:25
 "After" – 4:47
 "Frozen Lakes on Mars" – 5:54
 "Undercurrent" – 10:00
 "Austere" – 6:16
 "Heaven's Black Sea" – 6:15
 "On the Shores" – 10:12

Personnel

Ihsahn – vocals, guitar, keyboard, piano
Lars K. Norberg  (of Spiral Architect) – fretless bass
Jørgen Munkeby  (of Shining) – saxophone
Asgeir Mickelson   (of Borknagar and Spiral Architect) – drums

Production
Arranged & Produced By Ihsahn
Recorded & Engineered By Borge Finstad, Ihsahn, Lars Norberg (Bass) & Asgeir Mickelson (drums, percussion)
Mixed & Mastered By Jens Bogren

References

2010 albums
Ihsahn albums